Roy McCatty (born 18 July 1947) is a Jamaican cricketer. He played in seven first-class matches for the Jamaican cricket team in 1968/69 and 1969/70.

See also
 List of Jamaican representative cricketers

References

External links
 

1947 births
Living people
Jamaican cricketers
Jamaica cricketers
Sportspeople from Kingston, Jamaica